David Bolinsky (born May 2, 1952) is a former lead medical illustrator at Yale. He is a co-founder of XVIVO, which produced the movie The Inner Life of the Cell.

After earning a Bachelor of Science in Medical Illustration at Ohio State University and completing two years of medical school at Michigan State University, he launched his first illustration company, Advanced Imaging Inc., in 1983.

His father was a sculptor and art historian who taught at University at Buffalo, The State University of New York. He was inspired by the works of Frank Netter.

Bolinsky also designed and served as one of the narrators for an Internet video entitled Flu Attack! How A Virus Invades Your Body.

References

External links
 Wired News article with interview of Bolinsky
 
 TED Talks: David Bolinsky animates a cell  (TED2007)

1952 births
Living people
Yale University staff
Medical illustrators
Ohio State University alumni
American animators
American animated film producers
Scientific animators